Burnham is a village in North Lincolnshire, England. It forms part of the civil parish of Thornton Curtis.

Villages in the Borough of North Lincolnshire